Line break may refer to:

 Line break (poetry), a literary device
 Line break, line breaking character, manual line break, or newline
 Automatic line break, or line wrap and word wrap
 Help:Line-break handling